Thomas Brassey, 1st Earl Brassey  (11 February 1836 – 23 February 1918), was a British Liberal Party politician, Governor of Victoria and founder of The Naval Annual.

Background and education
Brassey was the eldest son of the railway magnate Thomas Brassey (1805-1870), by his wife Maria Harrison, a daughter of Joseph Harrison, a forwarding and shipping agent. He was the elder brother of Henry Brassey and Albert Brassey. He was educated at Rugby and University College, Oxford, and was called to the Bar, Lincoln's Inn, in 1864.

Political career
Brassey was briefly Member of Parliament (MP) for Devonport in 1865, winning the seat at a by-election in June and then losing it again the general election in July. He returned to Parliament three years later as the representative for Hastings at the 1868 general election, holding that seat until he was defeated at the 1886 general election. He was President of the first day of the 1874 Co-operative Congress.
He served under William Ewart Gladstone as Civil Lord of the Admiralty from 1880 to 1884 and as Parliamentary Secretary to the Admiralty from 1884 to 1884. He was made a Knight Commander of the Order of the Bath (KCB) in 1881 and raised to the peerage as Baron Brassey, of Bulkeley in the County of Chester, in 1886. He again held office under Gladstone and then Lord Rosebery as a Lord-in-waiting from 1893 to 1895. In 1893 Queen Victoria appointed nine members as the Royal Opium Commission, which consisted of seven British and two Indian members, which was headed by Lord Brassey, who served as the Chairman. The commission was to report on whether India Opium export trade to far east (China) should be ended and, further, whether poppy growing and consumption of Opium in India itself should be prohibited save for medical purpose.

Governor of Victoria
From 1895 to 1900 he was Governor of Victoria, a colony in Australia, and lived in its capital, Melbourne, in Government House. He returned to the United Kingdom in March 1900, by way of Colombo.

Brassey is remembered in Australia's national capital, Canberra, with Brassey House, now a hotel (originally a guest house) in the inner suburb of Barton, Australian Capital Territory, completed in 1927 to coincide with the relocation of the Federal Parliament from Melbourne to Canberra. Brassey House originally offered 45 rooms with shared bathing facilities, for the exclusive use of members of parliament and mid-level government officials relocating to Canberra. During the mid 1960s the government of the day expanded the capacity to 131 rooms and added conference and meeting rooms. It was sold in the mid-1980s to local businessmen and has been operated since as a residential hotel, now with 75 rooms including ensuites. It is said to have been built back-to-front, with the more ornate façade facing Belmore Gardens and its plainer face to Macquarie Street.

Sailing activities
Brassey's first experience of sailing was whilst he was still at Rugby school. After a short spell in a hired yacht called Zillah he started to compete successfully in club events in a yacht called Cymba (1855).  In 1859 he became the owner of an iron yacht of 120 tons called Albatross, designed by his friend St Clare John Byrne and built at his father's Canada Works. He was elected as a member of the Royal Yacht Squadron at this time.  In 1866 he ventured into auxiliary steam with the yacht Meteor and in 1872 used the steam yacht Eothen to visit Canada - although the vessel proved not to be best suited for this type of work.  Eothen had formerly been owned by the co-founder of P & O Company - Arthur Anderson.

Between 6 July 1876 and 27 May 1877 Brassey circumnavigated the world in his steam-assisted three-masted topsail-yard schooner Sunbeam, another yacht designed for him by St Clare Byrne. This voyage is said to have been the first circumnavigation by a private yacht. His son Thomas left the Sunbeam at Rio de Janeiro in order to return to school in England. His wife Annie, Lady Brassey (1839–1887), published an account of the cruise entitled In The Trades, The Tropics, & The Roaring Forties, or alternatively A Voyage in the Sunbeam:  Our Home on the Ocean For Eleven Months. In 1880 Brassey's book The British Navy was published. In 1886, he started The Naval Annual (generally referred to as Brassey's Naval Annual).  He edited The Naval Annual until 1891. He was succeeded as editor by his son Thomas.

At the age of 79 Brassey sailed his yacht Sunbeam to Mudros Bay in order to support the troops as a hospital ship during the Gallipoli Campaign.

Honours and awards
Brassey was President of the Royal Statistical Society from 1879 to 1880. He was conferred with Honorary Membership of the Institution of Engineers and Shipbuilders in Scotland in 1891. Following his return from Australia, he was President of the London Chamber of Commerce 1901–1902. He served as Lord Warden of the Cinque Ports from 1908 to 1913. 

He was appointed a Knight Grand Cross of the Order of the Bath in 1906 and made Viscount Hythe, of Hythe in the County of Kent, and Earl Brassey in 1911.

He was commissioned as a 2nd Lieutenant in the part-time 6th (Hastings) Cinque Ports Artillery Volunteer Corps on 1 June 1861, and was later the captain of the 9th (Pevensey) Cinque Ports AVC. He was appointed Honorary Colonel of the successor unit, the 2nd Cinque Ports Artillery Volunteers on 2 December 1891.

King David Kalākaua of Hawaii bestowed on Brassey the honour "Knight Commander of the Royal Order of Kalākaua".

Freemasonry
He was a freemason. He was initiated to the craft as an Oxford student. In 1868, he became a member of Abbey Lodge No. 1184 and remained for 48 years. He was also a member of Derwent Lodge No. 4 and a founding brother of Navy Lodge No. 2612. When he was appointed Governor of Victoria, while he had never held any Lodge office, he was appointed Honorary Past Junior Grand Warden. In Melbourne, became a member of Clarke Lodge No. 98 and became its Senior Warden in 1896 and its Worshipful Master in 1897. On 4 May 1896 two days before being installed as Senior Warden, he was installed Grand Master of the Grand Lodge of Victoria. His becoming of Grand Master was a bit controversial because many members preferred then-current Grand Master Sir William Clarke, 1st Baronet to stay and nominated him again. Clarke said that he would like the nomination to be withdrawn if Brassey was willing to serve. Brassey approved and Clarke withdrew the nomination, so Brassey was the sole candidate and therefore elected Grand Master.

Family

Brassey married firstly, in 1860, Anna Allnutt, daughter of John Allnutt, of Clapham, Surrey. They had one son and four daughters. The third daughter, Lady Muriel Agnes, married Gilbert Sackville, 8th Earl De La Warr, and was the mother of Herbrand Sackville, 9th Earl De La Warr, while the fourth daughter, Lady Marie Adelaide, married Freeman Freeman-Thomas, 1st Marquess of Willingdon. Lady Brassey died in September 1887, aged 47.

Brassey married secondly Lady Sybil de Vere Capell, daughter of Arthur Capell, Viscount Malden, and sister of George Capell, 7th Earl of Essex, in 1890. They had one daughter. Brassey died in February 1918, aged 82, and was succeeded in the earldom by his only son, Thomas.

References

External links

 
 
 
 

|-

1836 births
1918 deaths
Lords Warden of the Cinque Ports
Governors of Victoria (Australia)
Knights of the Order of St John
Liberal Party (UK) Lords-in-Waiting
Lords of the Admiralty
Presidents of the Royal Statistical Society
Liberal Party (UK) MPs for English constituencies
UK MPs 1859–1865 
UK MPs 1868–1874
UK MPs 1874–1880
UK MPs 1880–1885
UK MPs 1885–1886
UK MPs who were granted peerages
Deputy Lieutenants of Sussex
Thomas Brassey, 1st Earl Brassey
Presidents of Co-operative Congress
Alumni of University College, Oxford
English justices of the peace
Knights Grand Cross of the Order of the Bath
Earls in the Peerage of the United Kingdom
Recipients of the Royal Order of Kalākaua
Colony of Victoria people
Peers of the United Kingdom created by Queen Victoria
Peers created by George V
Viscounts created by George V
Australian Freemasons
Masonic Grand Masters